Bogaczewo may refer to the following places:
Bogaczewo, Elbląg County in Warmian-Masurian Voivodeship (north Poland)
Bogaczewo, Giżycko County in Warmian-Masurian Voivodeship (north Poland)
Bogaczewo, Ostróda County in Warmian-Masurian Voivodeship (north Poland)